This is a list of years in Lebanon.

20th century

21st century

See also
 Timeline of Lebanese history
 Timeline of Beirut

 
 Year
Lebanon-related lists
Lebanon